Shadowlands may refer to:

Books
Shadowlands, a non-fiction book on a scientific theory by Robert Foot
Shadowlands: Fear and Freedom at the Oregon Standoff, a book by Anthony McCann
The Shadowlands, a children's fantasy novel by Emily Rodda, from Deltora Quest 2
Shadowlands: The True Story of C. S. Lewis and Joy Davidman, a book by Brian Sibley

Film, television, and theatre
 Shadowlands (1985 film), a 1985 BBC TV movie about the relationship between C. S. Lewis and Joy Davidman
Shadowlands (play), a stage play adapted from the 1985 TV Movie by William Nicholson about C. S. Lewis and Joy Gresham
 Shadowlands (1993 film), a 1993 adaptation of the William Nicholson play
 "Shadowlands" (Bluey), an episode of the first season of the animated television series Bluey

Games
Shadowlands (video game),  1992 computer role playing game published by Domark
Shadowlands, the second expansion pack for the MMORPG Anarchy Online
World of Warcraft: Shadowlands, a 2020 expansion pack

Settings within games
Shadowlands, south of Rokugan in the Legend of the Five Rings game setting
Shadowlands, setting within Eternal (video game)

Music
 Shadowlands (Glass Hammer album), 2004
 Shadowlands (Klaus Schulze album), 2013
 "The Shadowlands," a song by Ryan Adams on his album Love Is Hell
 "Shadowlands" album by Sheila Walsh 1986

See also
Shadowland (disambiguation)